The Night Club Queen is a 1934 British musical mystery film directed by Bernard Vorhaus and starring Mary Clare, Jane Carr and Lewis Shaw.

Cast
 Mary Clare as Mary Brown  
 Jane Carr as Bobbie Lamont  
 Lewis Shaw as Peter Brown  
 Lewis Casson as Edward Brown  
 George Carney as Hale 
 Merle Tottenham as Alice Lamont  
 Drusilla Wills as Aggie  
 Syd Crossley as Jimmy  
 Felix Aylmer as Prosecution 
 The Sherman Fisher Girls as Dancers  
 Desmond Tester as Messenger Boy In Nightclub

References

Bibliography
 Low, Rachael. Filmmaking in 1930s Britain. George Allen & Unwin, 1985.
 Wood, Linda. British Films, 1927-1939. British Film Institute, 1986.

External links

1934 films
British musical films
1934 musical films
Films directed by Bernard Vorhaus
Films shot at Twickenham Film Studios
Films set in England
British black-and-white films
1934 mystery films
British mystery films
1930s English-language films
1930s British films